Olena Viktorivna Demyanenko (born May 8, 1966 in Lviv) is a Ukrainian film director, film producer, and screenwriter. She is a member of the National Union of Cinematographers of Ukraine, the Ukrainian Film Academy (since 2017) and the European Film Academy (since 2018). In 1990 she graduated from the Karpenko-Kary Kyiv Institute of Theater Arts.

Filmography 
A selection of films she has directed:
 Hutsulka Ksenya (2019) also producer and writer 
 Moya babusya Fani Kaplan (2016) also producer and writer
 Mayakovskiy, Dva Dnya (8 part TV mini series) (2013)
 F 63.9 Bolezn Iyubvi (2013)

Awards and nominations 
Winner - 2020 Ukrainian Film Academy Awards (Best Screenplay) for Hutsuilka Ksenya, also nominated for Best Film.

2014 Odesa International Film Festival national competition for F 63.9 Bolezn Iyubvi 

2016 Odesa International Film Festival national competition for Moya babusya Fani Kaplan, which was also nominated for

2017 Ukrainian Film Academy Awards (Best Film, Best Director)

She was also nominated in the Ukrainian Film Critics Awards, with Dmitriy Tomashpolskiy, in 2021 (Best Feature Film) for Storonnly (2019)

References 

Living people
1966 births
Kyiv National I. K. Karpenko-Kary Theatre, Cinema and Television University alumni
Ukrainian film directors
Ukrainian screenwriters
Ukrainian women film directors
Ukrainian producers